Bronze Age is an archaeological era, the second part of the three-age system (Stone Age, Bronze Age, and Iron Age) for classifying and studying prehistoric societies. 

It may also refer to:

 Bronze Age, one of the Ages of Man in classical mythology
 Bronze Age of Comic Books, a period in the history of American comic books
 Age of Bronze (comics), a comic book published by Image Comics
 The Age of Bronze, a sculpture by Rodin

See also 

 Copper Age
 Age (disambiguation)
 Bronze (disambiguation)
 Age of Bronze (disambiguation)
 Golden Age (disambiguation)
 Silver age (disambiguation)